Mxolisi Donald Mbuyisa Mgojo is a South African businessman and the CEO of Exxaro. He succeeded Sipho Nkosi. Mgojo used to be employed at Eyesizwe Coal. He serves as a director of Tronox and Richards Bay Coal Terminal. He studied at the Wharton School of Business.

References

South African businesspeople
Living people
Year of birth missing (living people)
Place of birth missing (living people)

External links 

 Official website of Exxaro